The St. Louis Ambush was a professional indoor soccer team based in St. Louis, Missouri. Before they moved to St. Louis they were known as the Tulsa Ambush.

History
The Ambush were founded in Tulsa, Oklahoma: the team played one season at Tulsa's Expo Square Pavilion. Vernon Riggs was the general manager. Keith Dial was the managing general partner. Former Tulsa Roughneck and Major Indoor Soccer League player Victor Moreland was signed to be the player/coach.

The Wichita-based ownership group had hoped to buy a Wichita NPSL franchise but moved forward with the team in Tulsa when the Wings remained in the MISL for the 1991–1992 season. When the Wings did join the NPSL for the 1992–93 season after the MISL folded with two other MISL teams (Cleveland and Baltimore) and after searching for Tulsa owners, the team was sold to St. Louis physicians Dr. Abraham Hawatmeh and Dr. Richard Rende in the summer of 1992. Hawatmeh and Rende moved the franchise to St. Louis and played first in the St. Louis Arena, then the Kiel Center.

The Ambush made the playoffs every year that they played in St. Louis, except their final year of 1999–2000.  The Ambush won one National Professional Soccer League championship (1994–1995 season), and played in four NPSL Championship series (1994, 1995, 1998, 1999), losing to the Cleveland Crunch twice (in 1994 and 1999), and to the Milwaukee Wave (1998), but defeated the Harrisburg Heat in 1995 for their lone NPSL title.

In 2013, an expansion team in the third Major Indoor Soccer League was named after this franchise. That team became a member of the Major Arena Soccer League after the MISL collapsed.

Year-by-year

Coaches
  Victor Moreland (1991–1992)
  Steve Pecher (1992–1993)
  Daryl Doran (1993–1999)
  Jamie Swanner (1999–2000)
  Joe Reiniger (2000)
  Jorge Espinoza (2000)

References

 
A
A
Association football clubs established in 1991
Defunct indoor soccer clubs in the United States
National Professional Soccer League (1984–2001) teams
Sports clubs disestablished in 2000
1991 establishments in Oklahoma
2000 disestablishments in Missouri